"No Billag" was a popular initiative in Switzerland proposing abolishing the licence fee for public service radio and television, then known as Billag. The referendum date was set to 4 March 2018. The proposal led to months of debate.

Proponents of the initiative said it wasn't fair that everyone should have to pay the fee regardless of whether they consumed the media produced. They argued that the total yearly sum of 1.37 billion francs should be spent by consumers and that the SRG SSR would become more politically independent if it did not depend on the mandatory fee.

Opponents of the initiative said that removing the mandatory fee would threaten national cohesion and that the country would become a "media desert" which would be dangerous to Switzerland's system of direct democracy. A committee, "Nein zum Sendeschluss", was formed to oppose the initiative. Opponents received support from 6000 artists who published an online statement "defending cultural diversity in Switzerland" and argued that cultural diversity would be threatened if the initiative passed.

Polls suggested 65 percent would vote against the proposal.

The initiative was rejected by 71.6 percent of voters.

References 

 2018 referendums
Popular initiatives (Switzerland)